The 2013 Dehradun Municipal Corporation election was a municipal election to the Dehradun Municipal Corporation, which governs Dehradun, the largest city in Uttarakhand. It took place on 28 April 2013.

Election Schedule

Mayoral election

Position of the house

See also
2013 Uttarakhand local elections
2013 Haridwar Municipal Corporation election

References

External links
 Official Website of the Dehradun Municipal Corporation
 Kanwali Ward Map
 Kanwali Ward Voter List

Dehradun Municipal Corporation
Dehradun
Local elections in Uttarakhand
2013 elections in India